The 1984 New Zealand Grand Prix was a race held at the Pukekohe Park Raceway on 7 January 1984. It was the 30th running of the New Zealand Grand Prix and was won by American Davy Jones. The podium was completed by Kiwi's David Oxton and Kenny Smith.

Classification

Race

References

Grand Prix
New Zealand Grand Prix
January 1984 sports events in New Zealand